The Man Who Rocked the Earth is a science fiction novel written in 1915 by Arthur C. Train and Robert W. Wood. It is notable for describing what an atomic detonation would look like in 1915, thirty years before the United States detonated the first atomic bomb.

External links

1915 American novels
American science fiction novels
1915 science fiction novels
Fiction set in 1916